Plaid is the second studio album by guitarist Blues Saraceno, released on February 28, 1992 through Guitar Recordings.

Track listing

Personnel
Blues Saraceno – guitar, bass, engineering, mixing, production
John Stix – slide guitar, mixing, production
Steve Blucher – lap steel guitar
Joe Franco – drums
Alex Saraceno – harmonica
Vic Steffens – engineering, mixing
Chris Brown – sequencing, digital editing
George Marino – mastering

References

Blues Saraceno albums
1992 albums
Albums recorded in a home studio